Kristin Key (born September 25, 1980) is an American comedian who has appeared at The Improv, and on the series Last Comic Standing and Bring the Funny. She favors a self-deprecating, physical, and improvisational style of comedy and incorporates the guitar to create original musical comedy.

Key was born in Aurora, Missouri, to a young Church of Christ minister and his homemaker wife. She has an older brother. She was raised in Liberal, Kansas, until the age of 11, when she moved to Amarillo, Texas. In Amarillo, Key attended middle school, high school, and college, where she majored in Paramedicine Technology.

Key began stand-up comedy at the age of 19 as the house MC for the Amarillo Comedy Club. Frustrated at the limitations for success in a small town and desperate to find another way, she set out to try open mic night at the local comedy club. The owner, Kevin Moran, told her she was too young to get into the club. The owners eventually softened, let her on stage, and instantly realized her potential. She was offered a standing M.C. position which she took advantage of week after week. In January 2006, the Amarillo Comedy Club shut down after the death of co-owner, comedian, and Key's mentor, Kelly Moran. Following the club's closing, she moved to San Marcos, Texas, to pursue comedy in the Austin scene.

Three months after moving to San Marcos, she auditioned for Last Comic Standing and was chosen to make the house. After several episodes, she finished 6th of thousands and has since been heard on XM and Sirius Satellite radio, is a regular on The Bob & Tom Show, has been seen on Comics Unleashed as well as many major networks including VH-1, Bravo, TV Guide Channel, and Fox Reality.

In 2019, Key competed in the American reality television comedy competition series Bring the Funny, making it to the second round (the "Comedy Clash").

She now lives in Redondo Beach, California; she is touring and pursuing various ventures in television. After surviving a car accident in the summer of 2013, Key decided she needed to focus on her own happiness. "The car caught on fire. It opened my eyes to taking more risks with my stand-up and not being so private on stage. Since I've been doing that, I feel like the laughs are bigger, and the moments I share with the audience are a lot more genuine.

References

External links
 
 Official homepage
 Myspace page
 Facebook page

Living people
American women comedians
Last Comic Standing contestants
People from Liberal, Kansas
Lesbian comedians
American lesbian actresses
American lesbian writers
American LGBT screenwriters
LGBT people from Texas
People from Aurora, Missouri
21st-century American comedians
Bring the Funny contestants
21st-century American screenwriters
21st-century American women writers
American LGBT comedians
1980 births